Sixth generation may refer to:

 Sixth Generation (film movement) (1990—), in Chinese cinema
 Sixth-generation fighter, a speculated generation of fighter aircraft expected to enter service around 2025–2030
 Sixth generation of video game consoles (1998-2013)
 The Sixth Generation (band), an American rock band
 Generation 6 (NASCAR), cars used in NASCAR since 2013

See also
 Generation (disambiguation)